= Deep Space Navigator =

Board game

Deep Space Navigator is a 1983 board game published by Tactical Templates.

== Gameplay ==
Deep Space Navigator is a tactical science fiction board game involving ship to ship space battles.

== Reception ==
Tony Watson reviewed Deep Space Navigator in Space Gamer No. 67. Watson commented that "Deep Space Navigator's template is a novel addition to the standard panoply of game components, but alone, it's not enough to carry the title. If the designers had followed through on their work, DSN could have been a very good game. As it is, it is naggingly incomplete, and can't be recommended."

== Reviews ==
- Asimov's Science Fiction v8 n3 (1984 03)
- Games #53
